The Ginetta-Juno P3-15, also known as the Ginetta-Juno P3 is a Le Mans Prototype LMP3 built to ACO Le Mans Prototype LMP3 regulations. It was designed by Ewan Baldry, and built by Ginetta Cars. The car was the first car to launch, and run in the class, with it making its debut at the 2015 4 Hours of Silverstone. It subsequently formed the basis of the G57 P2, and the later G58. A direct successor to the P3-15, the G61-LT-P3, was developed to meet the new 2020 LMP3 regulations, while retaining the original tub utilised in the P3-15.

Development 
In 2013, the ACO announced a new category of Le Mans Prototypes, known as LMP3, which would replace the previous Le Mans Prototype Challenge (LMPC) class in 2015. Shortly afterwards, Juno Racing Cars announced that it would be building a car for the class, before it was purchased by Ginetta. The engine is a Nissan VK50VE producing 420 hp, paired to an Xtrac 6-Speed Manual Sequential Gearbox. The car had its first shakedown run at Leeds East Airport, with Ginetta chairman Lawrence Tomlinson at the wheel.

The car was initially overweight, due to a misprediction of the mass of the powertrain, until the minimum weight of the class was raised to 930 kg by the ACO. After the 2015 season, it was announced that Ginetta would be moving on from the project, and focusing on the G57 P2 Track day car. This was due to a dispute between powertrain components supplier ORECA, and Ginetta.

The tub of the car is shared with its successors, the Ginetta G57 P2, the Ginetta G58, and the Ginetta G61-LT-P3, and can be upgraded with new bodywork and engine configurations to be built up into its successors.

Roborace Devbot 
The car also formed the base of the Roborace Devbot, used for the development of the Artificial Intelligence software for the future electrically powered autonomous racing series. The Devbot incorporates the same internal units that are used in the actual RoboCar, and is stripped off all bodywork, to provide better cooling and access. The Devbot would have its initial public test during Pre-Season testing for the 2016–17 FIA Formula E Championship, at the Donington Park Circuit.

Competition History 
In October 2014, the first car was announced to be sold to the University of Bolton, under its Centre for Advanced Performance Engineering (CAPE). For the 2015 season, 6 cars would be run in the European Le Mans series, with 2 run by the factory Ginetta team, Team LNT. The factory cars secured the 1st and 2nd in the LMP3 Championship. The Ginettas also won all races in the season, while the sole non-Ginetta car, a Ligier JS P3 run by Graff Racing managed a podium on its debut, at the end of the season.

Following the end of the season, after Ginetta's announcement, that it would shift its focus towards the G57 P2, the car was dropped by most teams, which switched to the Ligier JS P3. The car has remained more popular in Asia since the 2015 season, although it is noted to be similarly quick to the Ligier.

Complete European Le Mans Series results 
Results in bold indicate pole position. Results in italics indicate fastest lap.

Complete Asian Le Mans Series results 
Results in bold indicate pole position. Results in italics indicate fastest lap.

References 

Le Mans Prototypes
24 Hours of Le Mans race cars
Sports prototypes
Ginetta vehicles
Racing cars